Josep M. Guerrero is a professor at AAU Faculty of Engineering and Science and at the Department of Energy Technology, Aalborg University. He was named Fellow of the Institute of Electrical and Electronics Engineers (IEEE) in 2015 for contributions to distributed power systems and microgrids.

References

External links

20th-century births
Living people
Danish engineers
Academic staff of Aalborg University
Fellow Members of the IEEE
Year of birth missing (living people)
Place of birth missing (living people)